Stentor coeruleus  is a protist in the family Stentoridae which is characterized by being a very large ciliate that measures 0.5 to 2 millimetres when fully extended.

Stentor coeruleus specifically appears as a very large trumpet. It contains a macronucleus that looks like a string of beads that are contained within a ciliate that is blue to blue-green in color. It has the ability to contract into a ball through the contraction of its many myonemes. It has the ability to swim while both fully extended or contracted.

Stentor coeruleus is known for its regenerative abilities. When this organism is cut in half, each half is able to regenerate a half-sized cell that has its normal anatomy and will look the same way it did prior to being cut.
It feeds by means of cilia that carry food into the gullet.

DNA
The genetic code is the "universal" code, and not the usual form  for ciliates. The introns are unusually small, only 15 or 16 nucleotides long.

Reproduction
S. coeruleus are capable of sexual reproduction, or conjugation, but primarily reproduce asexually by binary fission.

References

Heterotrichea
Species described in 1830